Olga Vasilievna Perovskaya (9 April 1902 – 1961) was a Soviet children's literature writer. Her most notable work Rebyata i Zveryata (Kids and Cubs) was published in 1925. It is a series of stories of about the various pets she and her sisters (Sonya, Yulia and Natasha) kept during their childhood. She was arrested on 15 March 1943 and sentenced to 10 years imprisonment in labour camps during the Great Purge. Her sentence was later modified to one of exile. During 1940–50, her books were not published. She was rehabilitated toward the end of the fifties. Rebyata i Zveryata has been translated into a number of languages including English, Malayalam and Tamil. In English, it has been published under two different titles Kids and Cubs and The Wolf in Olga's Kitchen.

Publications
 Rebi︠a︡ta i zveri︠a︡ta : rasskazy, 1929
 Menschen- und Tierkinder, 1933
 Marmotka, 1939
 Tygřík Vaska, 1958
 Tigrënok vasʹka, 1959
 Kids and cubs, 1966
 The wolf in Olga's kitchen, 1969
 Mały tiger Waska powědančce, 1984
 Rebi︠a︡ta i zveri︠a︡ta : povesti o zhivotnykh, 1993

References

Sources

1902 births
1961 deaths
People from Zaporizhzhia Oblast
People from Taurida Governorate
Soviet children's writers
Russian children's writers
Russian women children's writers
20th-century Russian women writers
20th-century Russian writers
Soviet women writers